Denmark was represented by Lonnie Devantier, with the song "Hallo Hallo", at the 1990 Eurovision Song Contest, which took place on 5 May in Zagreb. "Hallo Hallo" was chosen as the Danish entry at the Dansk Melodi Grand Prix on 24 March.

Before Eurovision

Dansk Melodi Grand Prix 1990 
The final was held at the Tivoli in Copenhagen, hosted by two former Danish Eurovision representatives, the previous year's Birthe Kjær and Dario Campeotto (1961). Ten songs took part with the winner being decided by two rounds of televoting. In the first round the bottom five songs were eliminated, then the remaining five were voted on again to give the winner. Other participants included three-time Danish representative Kirsten Siggaard (of Hot Eyes) and Jørgen Olsen, the 2000 Eurovision winner.

At Eurovision 
On the night of the final Devantier performed 11th in the running order, following Israel and preceding Switzerland. The song was very much in the same uptempo pop vein which had characterised Danish Eurovision entries throughout the 1980s. At the close of voting "Hallo Hallo" had received 64 points from 13 countries, placing Denmark 8th of the 22 entries, the country's fifth consecutive top 10 finish. The Danish jury awarded its 12 points to Switzerland.

Voting

References 

1990
Countries in the Eurovision Song Contest 1990
Eurovision